The American School of Santo Domingo (ASSD) is an international bilingual school in Santo Domingo. 

Accredited by the Dominican Ministry of Education and by AdvancED, its students graduate with a high school diploma valid in the Dominican Republic, the United States, and internationally.

References

External links

 American School of Santo Domingo

Santo Domingo
Schools in Santo Domingo
International schools in the Dominican Republic